Marin County, California contains many public and private schools and a few higher education institutions.

School districts

School districts include:

K-12:
 Novato Unified School District
 Shoreline Unified School District

Secondary:
 Petaluma Joint Union High School District
 San Rafael City High School District
 Tamalpais Union High School District

Elementary:

 Bolinas-Stinson Union School District
 Dixie School District
 Kentfield School District
 Laguna Joint School District
 Lagunitas School District
 Larkspur School District
 Lincoln Elementary School District
 Mill Valley School District
 Nicasio School District
 Reed Union School District
 Ross Elementary School District
 Ross Valley School District
 San Rafael City Schools
 Sausalito Marin City School District

Elementary and middle schools

Bolinas
 Bolinas-Stinson Union School District - Bolinas (4-8) & Stinson Beach (K-3)

Corte Madera

 Marin Montessori School
 Marin Country Day School
 Neil Cummins Elementary School

Fairfax
 Manor School
 White Hill Middle School
 Saint Rita School (private)

Kentfield
 Adeline E. Kent Middle School
 Bacich Elementary

Larkspur

 Marin Primary & Middle School
 Henry C. Hall Middle School
 Ring Mountain School
 St. Patrick's (private)

Mill Valley

 Old Mill School
 Edna Maguire Elementary
 Marin Horizon School
 Mill Valley Middle School
 Mount Tamalpais School
 Park School
 Tam Valley Elementary School
 Ring Mountain Day School
 Strawberry Point School

Novato
 Hamilton Elementary School
 Loma Verde Elementary School
 Lu Sutton Elementary School
 Lynwood Elementary School
 Montessori School Of Novato
 North Bay Christian Academy
 Novato Charter School
 Olive Elementary School
 Our Lady Of Loretto School
 Pleasant Valley Elementary
 Rancho Elementary School
 Samuel Hazelton School of the Arts 
 San Jose Middle School
 San Ramon Elementary
 Sinaloa Middle School

Point Reyes Station
 West Marin School

Ross
 Ross School

San Anselmo
 Brookside Elementary School
 Wade Thomas Elementary School
 St. Anselm School (private)
 Hidden Valley Elementary School

San Rafael

 Bahia Vista Elementary School
 Brandeis Marin
 Caulbridge School (private)
 Coleman Elementary School
 Glenwood Elementary School
 James B. Davidson Middle School
 Laurel Dell Elementary School
 Lucas Valley Elementary School
 Mary E. Sylveira Elementary School
 Miller Creek Middle School
 Sun Valley Elementary School
 Mark Day School - private
 St. Raphael School - private
 St. Isabella - private
 Vallecito Elementary School
 Venetia Valley K-8 School
 The Marin School

Sausalito
 Bayside/MLK Elementary School
 Willow Creek Academy School

Tiburon
 Bel Aire School
 Del Mar Middle School
 Reed Elementary School
 St. Hilary School

Tomales
 Tomales Elementary School

High schools

Kentfield
 Marin Catholic High School, private school

Corte Madera/Tiburon/Ross/Greenbrae/Kentfield/Larkspur

 Redwood High School

Continuing Education
 San Andreas High School, continuation school
 Tamiscal High School, independent study

Mill Valley
 Tamalpais High School

Novato
 Marin Oaks High School, continuation school
 Marin School of Arts and Technology
 Novato High School
 San Marin High School
 North Bay Christian Academy

Ross
 The Branson School, private school

San Anselmo

 San Domenico School, private school
 Sir Francis Drake High School

San Rafael

 Madrone High School, continuation school
 Marin Academy, private school
 San Rafael High School
 Terra Linda High School

Sausalito
 The Marin School, private school

Tomales
 Tomales High School

Colleges and universities

 College of Marin - Kentfield, Indian Valley
 Dominican University of California - San Rafael
 Golden Gate Baptist Theological Seminary, Strawberry Point
 San Francisco Theological Seminary - San Anselmo

Former colleges and universities
Columbia Pacific University (1978–2000)
World College West (1973–1992)

Other schools and institutes
Ali Akbar College of Music
Institute of Noetic Sciences

References